Petersroda is a village and a former municipality in the district of Anhalt-Bitterfeld, in Saxony-Anhalt, Germany. Since 1 July 2009, it is part of the town Sandersdorf-Brehna.

Former municipalities in Saxony-Anhalt
Sandersdorf-Brehna